Olenecamptus kenyensis is a species of beetle in the family Cerambycidae. It was described by Adlbauer in 2010. It is known from Kenya.

References

Dorcaschematini
Beetles described in 2010